Hugs and Kisses is a 1967 Swedish comedy drama film directed by Jonas Cornell. The film stars Agneta Ekmanner, Sven-Bertil Taube, Lena Granhagen, Håkan Serner, and Ingrid Boström in the lead roles. Musical direction was by Bengt Ernryd.

Cast
 Agneta Ekmanner as Eva
 Sven-Bertil Taube as Max
 Lena Granhagen as Kickan
 Håkan Serner as John
 Ingrid Boström as Friend
 Rolf Larsson as Photographer
 Leif Zern as Shop assistant
 Rebecca Tarschys as Journalist
 Carl-Johan Rönn as Photographer
 Peter Cornell as Young man
 Tuulikki Lindroth as Photo model (credited as Tulikke Lindroth)
 Staffan Cullberg as Lecturer

References

External links

1960s Swedish-language films
1967 films
1967 comedy-drama films
Swedish comedy-drama films
1960s Swedish films